Prostanthera pedicellata is a species of flowering plant in the family Lamiaceae and is endemic to a restricted area of Western Australia. It is a small shrub with densely glandular branches, egg-shaped to oval leaves and red flowers.

Description
Flowering occurs from August to November.

Taxonomy
Prostanthera pedicellata was first formally described in 1984 by Barry Conn in the Journal of the Adelaide Botanic Garden from specimens collected by Eric Ashby in 1969, near Pindar.

Distribution and habitat
This mintbush grows on ironstone gravel on plains and is only known from near Pindar in the Avon Wheatbelt biogeographic region, where its population size is decreasing due to land clearing.

Conservation status
Prostanthera pedicellata is classified as "Priority One" by the Government of Western Australia Department of Parks and Wildlife, meaning that it is known from only one or a few locations which are potentially at risk.

References

pedicellata
Flora of Western Australia
Lamiales of Australia
Taxa named by Barry John Conn
Plants described in 1984